Stacey A. Jones, better known as No Nonsense, is an American rapper from Olympia, Washington. Since 2005, No Nonsense has recorded over 400 tracks with various regional and nationally recognized artists, including Divine Mental, Overtime, JoJo, and many more. His latest heavily anticipated  project, "The I-5 Bandit," includes appearances from numerous well known acts, such as Nicki Minaj, Mistah FAB, and more.

Likely the most prolific Northwest rap artist since Sir Mix-a-lot, No Nonsense has slowly expanded his pursuit of hiphop fame and fortune to include such partnerships as Northwest Connect, featuring artists Young Soprano, E-Tab, and No Nonsense collaborating, as well as other hiphop cultural ventures such as custom auto detailing and installation, signing multiple acts to his label, Double Trouble Records, and pushing for distribution of Northwest artists.*

Having developed a feel for his market and audience, incorporated social media into his guerilla marketing campaign, and recruited his twin brother, CEO Stephen Jones, an in-house engineer, aaron j., and numerous die-hard independent hiphop acts, No Nonsense has continued to expand his national ambitions, and is currently working on a multi-city tour with his label's talent as well as reaching out to other Northwest hiphop acts.

References 

www.crimeskiproductionz.com== External links ==
 http://www.reverbnation.com/nononsenserapper

Year of birth missing (living people)
Living people
Musicians from Olympia, Washington
African-American rappers
21st-century American rappers
21st-century African-American musicians